Elliott Grays Marker-Jefferson Davis Highway is a historic route marker located on U.S. Route 1, or Jefferson Davis Highway, in Richmond, Virginia. It was erected in 1929, by the United Daughters of the Confederacy. It is one of 16 erected in Virginia along the Jefferson Davis Highway between 1927 and 1947.  The marker is an inscribed granite slab with smooth flat faces and rough-cut edges.  It measures 47 inches tall, 25 inches wide and 12 inches thick.  The stone is engraved with the text "Jefferson Davis Highway This tree marks the site of Battery 17 of the inner defenses of
Richmond, 1862-65, and is planted in soil taken from battlefields A memorial to Confederate Soldiers
by the Elliott Grays Chapter U.D.C. 1929."

It was listed on the National Register of Historic Places in 2006.

The website Roadside America calls this the "Highway Marker to a Dead Confederate Tree", pointing out that the tree mentioned in the inscription died decades ago.

References

1929 establishments in Virginia
Buildings and structures completed in 1929
Buildings and structures in Richmond, Virginia
Confederate States of America monuments and memorials in Virginia
Individual signs on the National Register of Historic Places
Individual signs in the United States
Jefferson Davis Highway
Monuments and memorials on the National Register of Historic Places in Virginia
National Register of Historic Places in Richmond, Virginia
Road transportation buildings and structures on the National Register of Historic Places
Transportation buildings and structures on the National Register of Historic Places in Virginia
United Daughters of the Confederacy monuments and memorials
U.S. Route 1